Kersley Appou (born April 24, 1970) is a footballer who last played for US Beau-Bassin Rose-Hill in the Mauritian Premier League as a forward. He has also represented Mauritius internationally with Club M, scoring 10 goals. That is the most goals scored in Mauritius national team history. On 13 April 2014, at the age of 43 years and 354 days, Appou became the oldest African to play international football eclipsing the record set by Cameroonian legend Roger Milla at the 1994 FIFA World Cup.

References

External links
 
 

Living people
1970 births
Mauritian footballers
Mauritius international footballers
Mauritian expatriate footballers
Expatriate footballers in Réunion
Mauritian expatriate sportspeople in Réunion
Mauritian Premier League players
AS Port-Louis 2000 players
Curepipe Starlight SC players
Pamplemousses SC players
Association football forwards